The governor of Benguet is the local chief executive of the Philippine province of Benguet.

List

Benguet sub-province 
The former sub-province of Benguet was part of the old Mountain Province (La Montañosa).

Benguet province 
On June 18, 1966, Mountain Province was divided into four provinces, creating the provinces of Benguet, Mountain Province, Ifugao, and Kalinga-Apayao.

References 

Governors of Benguet
Governors of provinces of the Philippines